Stumpers may refer to:
An Internet resource containing searchable archives for the Stumpers-L listserv
Stumpers!, a game show similar to Password, hosted by Allen Ludden from October to December 1976 on NBC